Daniela Alfinito  (née Ulrich; born 11 March 1971) is a German schlager singer from Hesse, Germany. She achieved first chart success with her 2015 album Ein bisschen sterben and reached number one in Germany with her 2019 and 2020 albums Du warst jede Träne wert and Liebes-Tattoo.

Life and career
Alfinito was born as the first and only daughter of Die Amigos' singer Bernd Ulrich in 1971 in Villingen, Baden-Wurttemberg. After finishing school she pursued a career as a geriatric nurse. She first became musically active at the age of seven, regularly joining her father and uncle on stage. She became more engaged in performing with the duo in 2000. Ever since 2003, she has accompanied them during concerts and other performances. In the same year, she started releasing music under her first name "Daniela". The singer received support from her father and uncle who helped her write and produce her 2003 debut album Ich vermisse dich nicht.... From 2008 to 2012, she released three more studio albums Bahnhof der Sehnsucht, Wahnsinn and Komm und tanz mit mir, all of which achieved little to no mainstream success. Only her 2015 release Ein bisschen sterben garnered success in Germany, Austria and Switzerland. While replicating the initial success with the 2017 follow-up release Sag mir wo bist du, she finally reached number one in Germany in January 2019 with the album Du warst jede Träne wert. The 2020 album Liebes-Tattoo became her second number-one album there and marked the first time she went number one in Austria and Switzerland.

In addition to recording music and touring, she keeps working as a geriatric nurse to this day. Alfinito married in 1995 and gave birth to a son in 1997.

Discography

Studio albums

Compilation albums

References

External links
  

1971 births
Schlager musicians
Living people
Musicians from Hesse
21st-century German women singers
People from Baden-Württemberg